The Allentown Bridge, in Apache County, Arizona, is a bridge which, in 1988 at least, existed and spanned the Puerco River. It was listed on the National Register of Historic Places in 1988.

Midland Bridge Company has some association in its history.

See also
 List of bridges on the National Register of Historic Places in Arizona
 National Register of Historic Places listings in Apache County, Arizona

References

Buildings and structures in Apache County, Arizona
Road bridges in Arizona
National Register of Historic Places in Apache County, Arizona
Steel bridges in the United States
Cantilever bridges in the United States
Navajo Nation